Un padre no tan padre is a 2016 Mexican comedy film directed by Raúl Martínez, from a screenplay by Alberto Bremer. The film stars Héctor Bonilla, Benny Ibarra, and Jaqueline Bracamontes. It premiered on 21 December 2016, and the plot revolves around Don Servando (Bonilla), a bitter 85-year-old man who has been evicted from the nursing home where he lived; So he is forced to move in with his son Francisco (Ibarra) and his friends. It was followed by a sequel, Grumpy Christmas, in 2021.

Cast 
 Héctor Bonilla as Don Servando
 Benny Ibarra as Francisco
 Jacqueline Bracamontes as Alma
 Arturo Barba as Bill
 Natália Subtil as Gio

Awards and nominations

References

External links 
 

2016 films
Mexican comedy films
2010s Mexican films